General Xu Yongchang (15 December 188512 July 1959) (Hsu Yung-chang; ; style name: Cichen (Tzu-chen)) was the Minister of Board of Military Operations of the Republic of China between December 22, 1948, and April 22, 1949, and the representative of the Republic of China on September 2, 1945, at the signing of the Instrument of Surrender of Japan that ended World War II.

Xu Yongchang graduated from the Beijing Military Institute and later became the General Commander of the 3rd Army under Feng Yü-hsiang and the 20th Route Jin Army under Yen Hsi-shan. He was the Chairman of Shanxi province at the time of Mukden Incident, and served in the National Revolutionary Army as the Chief Operations Supreme Staff.

After the Second Sino-Japanese War, he was the president of the Beijing Military Institute and the Minister of Defence. He represented China at the Japanese Instrument of Surrender. He went to Taiwan after the Chinese Civil War, served as a senior advisor to the Office of the President and a member of Central Review Committee, and died in 1959.

Xu Yongchang's diary was published by the Academia Sinica's Institute of Modern History in 1989.

See also
History of the Republic of China
Sino-Japanese War (1937-1945)

References

External links
Pictures of the Instrument of Surrender of Japan
The Generals of WWII
https://www.nytimes.com/1959/07/13/archives/hsu-yung-chang-70-i-chinese-army-aidei.html

Politicians of Taiwan
Senior Advisors to President Chiang Kai-shek
Republic of China politicians from Shanxi
1880s births
1959 deaths
Politicians from Xinzhou
Chinese military personnel of World War II
Chinese Civil War refugees
Taiwanese people from Shanxi